Selective Catholic schools were Roman Catholic secondary schools that existed in England until the beginning of the twenty-first century. They emerged out of successive governments' desire to create a free market in the state education system. These schools were able, primarily through selecting by interviewing prospect pupils along with their parents, to attract pupils from motivated families who were committed to the education and advancement of their children and to the schools themselves.

History
The London Oratory School in Fulham was one of the last to select its intake, until 2006 interviewing pupil candidates and their parents; afterwards it continued to select a small portion of its intake based on musical aptitude.. The John Fisher School in leafy Purley, Surrey, was interviewing prospect boys and their parents as recently as 2008.

These schools were extremely controversial,  particularly during the 1980s and 1990s, and received many complaints about social selectivity and bias towards middle-class candidates and their parents. The John Fisher School in Purley, for example, had a more complex admissions procedure than many neighbouring private schools.

In 1999 the government banned pupil selection by interview and many of the ancillary processes these schools used to determine their intake. Some selective Roman Catholic schools introduced a points admission system that effectively permitted them to select pupils, typically with candidates who are from "fully practising Catholic families" given priority, followed by other Roman Catholics, then non-Catholics.

Cardinal Vaughan Memorial School and The London Oratory School are known for selecting the sons of many politicians, including all of the sons of Tony Blair (Prime Minister from 1997 to 2007), and his daughter in the sixth form.

The schools today

Interviews; quizzing parents about their occupations; obtaining previous school reports - all of these processes have been outlawed by the Schools' Admissions Code. The consequence has been that whereas these schools could select some of the most able students in the past before the 11+ tests at the few remaining London grammar schools, these highly able pupils are now largely creamed off by said grammar schools.

References

Roman Catholic schools in England